Haami Tokouru Ratana (21 July 1894 – 30 October 1944) was a New Zealand politician and president of the Rātana Church. He joined Eruera Tirikatene in parliament as the second Rātana Independent Member of Parliament (MP), elected for the Western Maori electorate in 1935. Following the death of his father Tahupotiki Wiremu Ratana in 1939, Toko Ratana became the second Ratana movement president. He held both positions until his death in 1944.

Early life 

Eldest son of the founder of the Ratana Church, Toko Ratana was educated at Whangaehu School and was bilingual in English and Māori. After enlisting in the New Zealand Pioneer Battalion during World War I, he served in Gallipoli and later in France, where he suffered the effects of a gas attack. This caused him ill health for the rest of his life.

Political career 

Toko Ratana stood unsuccessfully for parliament multiple times. First as an independent candidate for the Western Maori seat against Maui Pomare in 1922. As a Ratana Independent candidate and one of the "first cut of the body of the mangai", he stood against Pomare again in 1928, against Taite Te Tomo in the 1930 by-election after Pomare’s death and again in the 1931 general election. 

He was elected in 1935, joining fellow Ratana MP Eruera Tirikatene. In 1936, he joined the Labour Party as the Ratana Movement and Labour formed a political alliance. He was re-elected in 1938 and 1943.

In his maiden speech in October 1937, Toko Ratana raised the principal political issue of Ratana – land grievances and the Treaty of Waitangi. He was to speak in the house only four more times. As the designated leader of the Ratana spiritual movement, the debates were left to Tirikatene and the other Ratana members. H. T. Ratana was frequently ill, and spent long periods in hospital.

War efforts 
During the Second World War, Toko Ratana was opposed to conscription but wished to have a home guard manned by Māori to defend their lands. As Kai-Arahi or leader of the Ratana Church, he made a public declaration of the church's support for the war, and supported Māori control over Māori contributions to the war.

Death 
Haami Tokouru Ratana died on 30 October 1944 after months of illness. He was succeeded both as MP for Western Maori and Ratana Church President by his younger brother, Matiu Rātana.

Notes

References 

 Henderson, James Mcleod (1963). Ratana The Man, The Church, The Movement (1st ed.) A.H & A.W. Reed Ltd .

1894 births
1944 deaths
New Zealand Labour Party MPs
New Zealand people of World War I
Rātana MPs
New Zealand Army personnel
New Zealand Rātanas
New Zealand MPs for Māori electorates
Members of the New Zealand House of Representatives
Unsuccessful candidates in the 1922 New Zealand general election
Unsuccessful candidates in the 1928 New Zealand general election
Unsuccessful candidates in the 1931 New Zealand general election